Image Studio™ Lite is free image processing software used for quantitation of Western blot images and images from related experiments.

As of 2021, Image Studio Lite has been discontinued and is no longer available for download. In its place, LICOR has released Empiria Studio, a commercial product. It is unclear from this announcement whether Empiria Studio will support acquisition for Odyssey FC imaging systems previously using Image Studio or if licenses will be granted to owners of machines previously using Image Studio.

Overview 

The primary function of Image Studio Lite is to quantitate relative abundance of proteins on a Western blot or DNA/RNA in an electrophoresis gel from an image of the blot or gel.

History 

Release history of Image Studio Lite software:

See also 

 ImageJ

References

Further reading

External links 

 
 
 
 
 
 
 
"Image Studio Lite Quantification Software has been discontinued." Retrieved 19 August 2021

Science software
Java (programming language) software